She Wanted a Cream Front Door is a 1947 comedy play by the British writer A.R. Whatmore.

It ran for 129 performances at the Apollo Theatre in London's West End between 6 February and 31 June 1947. The cast included Robertson Hare, Peter Haddon, Sidney Vivian and Ian Carmichael. It was produced by Austin Melford.

References

Bibliography
 Wearing, J.P. The London Stage 1940-1949: A Calendar of Productions, Performers, and Personnel.  Rowman & Littlefield, 2014.

1947 plays
British plays
Comedy plays
West End plays
Plays set in London